Lindsey Taylor Leavitt (born August 17, 1980) is an American author of young adult, Middle Grade novels, including the Princess for Hire Series, and juvenile fiction (the Commander in Cheese Series).

Biography

Life and early career
Lindsey Leavitt was born and grew up in Las Vegas, Nevada. She is the second of five children and graduated from Bonanza High School. She later went on to attend Brigham Young University where she studied to be an elementary school teacher. Leavitt stopped teaching and became a substitute teacher when her oldest daughter was born. While pregnant, Leavitt wrote what would later become Sean Griswold's Head. Leavitt then wrote the Princess for Hire series.

Writing career
Leavitt has published three Young Adult books, five middle grade novels (two with Robin Mellom), and five early chapter books (with illustrator A. G. Ford). Leavitt has also won numerous awards for her books including the YALSA Best Fiction for Young Adults, 
YALSA Popular Paperbacks for Young Adults, an Amazon Best Book of the Year, Kids’ Indies Next List, & Banks Street Best Children’s Books of the Year 

Leavitt is a full-time author and lives with her large blended family in Utah.

Bibliography

Willis Wilbur series

Willis Wilbur Wows the World (2022)
Wills Wilbur Meets His Match (2022)

Princess for Hire series
Princess for Hire (Princess for Hire #1) (2010)
The Royal Treatment (Princess for Hire #2) (2011)
A Farewell to Charms (Princess for Hire #3) (2012)

Standalone
Sean Griswold's Head (2011)
Going Vintage (2013)
The Chapel Wars (2014)

The Pages Between Us
The Pages Between Us (2017) (with Robin Mellom)
The Pages Between Us : In the Spotlight (2017) (with Robin Mellom)

Commander in Cheese series
Commander in Cheese #1: The Big Move (2016), illustrated by Ag Ford
Commander in Cheese #2: Oval Office Escape (2016), illustrated by Ag Ford
Commander in Cheese #3: Have a Mice Flight! (2016), illustrated by Ag Ford
Commander in Cheese #4: The Birthday Suit (2017), illustrated by Ag Ford
Commander in Cheese Super Special #1: Mouse Rushmore (2017), illustrated by Ag Ford

References

External links
 Lindsey Leavitt's official website
 Amazon's Author's Page for Lindsey Leavitt

1980 births
21st-century American novelists
Living people
21st-century American women writers
American women novelists
Writers from Las Vegas
Brigham Young University alumni